The First Battle of Cholet took place during the War in the Vendée on 15 March 1793 in which the city of Cholet was captured by the Vendée insurgents.

Prelude 
The Convention having ordered, on February 23, the levying of 300,000 men, the first riots began in the Mauges at the announcement of the terms of recruitment. On the 2nd and 3rd of March, young men from the canton assembled at Cholet by the district manifested their refusal to leave. At Beaupréau, mobs threatened the national guard who shot and killed three rebels and wounded eight.

On 12 March, at Saint-Florent-le-Vieil, 600 peasants put the republican forces to flight, on March 13, the peasants who put Jacques Cathelineau at their head took Jallais. On the 14th of March, Chemillé fell in his turn, stormed by these same peasants. Most of the 200 National Guards defending the city were captured, as well as their three culverins, the largest of which was renamed the "Marie-Jeanne" by the peasants of Anjou who made it a true mascot.

The victories of Cathelineau provoked the uprising of hundreds of other parishes which joined the small army of the insurgents, with notably Jean-Nicolas Stofflet.

The battle 
On 15 March the peasants, numbering 15,000, presented themselves before Cholet. An emissary was sent to negotiate the surrender of the patriots, but Beauveau, the commandant of the place, refused. He estimated that his 580 national guards, well armed, were sufficient to repel peasants armed with scythes.

But he was mistaken: in a few hours the insurgents seized the city, 150 patriots were killed, including Beauveau against 40 rebels. An important booty was seized.

Consequences  
The next day the insurgents seized Vihiers, whom the patriots had preferred to abandon. The peasants, however, were afraid of the repression of the "Blues" whom they knew to be inevitable. It was at this moment that the insurgents went to fetch the nobles of their country, former soldiers, to force them to put themselves at their head. Thus several nobles like Charles Artus of Bonchamps or Maurice Gigost of Elbée joined the insurrection.

At the initiative of their leaders, the insurgents then decided to march on Chalonnes-sur-Loire near Angers. The city was defended by 4,000 soldiers. Faced with the threat of the insurgents, the defenders preferred to abandon the city and retreated to Angers. At that moment the peasants who had driven the patriots out of their countries dispersed and returned home.

The revolt had thus ended, but the revolutionary armies sent to repress it were to restart the war in the Mauges.

On April 14, 1793, the Republican General Leygonier occupies the city of Cholet which will be resumed the next day by the Royalists. The Republican prisoners, including Jean-Julien Savary, were saved from death thanks to the prayer of the inhabitants.

References

Bibliography 
 
 
 .

Battles involving France
Conflicts in 1793
Battles of the War in the Vendée
History of Maine-et-Loire
1793 in France
Cholet